Bill Elliott Racing (formerly known as Charles Hardy Racing, Elliott-Hardy Racing, and Elliott-Marino Racing) was a NASCAR Winston Cup, Busch and Craftsman Truck Series team. It was owned and operated by 1988 NASCAR champion Bill Elliott from 1995 until 2000, when it was sold to Evernham Motorsports. The team's primary car was the No. 94 McDonald's Ford Winston Cup car driven by its owner, but also fielded various other cars.

Winston Cup

Car No. 13 history
Elliott's operation went multi-car full-time in 1998, teaming up with Dan Marino and renaming the team to Elliott-Marino Racing to field the No. 13 FirstPlus Financial Ford. Rookie Jerry Nadeau raced the car for the first half of the year, before he was released and replaced by Wally Dallenbach Jr., Dennis Setzer, Tom Hubert and Ted Musgrave.

In February 1999, the partnership between Elliott and Marino was dissolved and the No. 13 closed as a result. The No. 13 came back for the Daytona 500 with Dick Trickle, but didn't qualify.

Car No. 89 history
The 89 R&D car began as the No. 91 with Ron Barfield Jr. for the 1996 Brickyard 400. Barfield Jr. returned to the team, now the No. 92, for the 1997 Brickyard 400. A year later, the team was renumbered to the No. 89; driven by Dennis Setzer, it competed at the DieHard 500.

Car No. 94 history

The team was originally owned by Charles Hardy and ran part-time with various drivers under the Charles Hardy Racing name with sponsorship from Buss Fuses. Kenny Wallace made the first start for the No. 44 at Talladega Superspeedway, finishing in the ninth position. Jimmy Hensley and Bobby Hillin Jr. ran the car later in the season, but neither finished in the top-ten. Wanting to own his own team, Elliott partnered with Hardy for the 1995 season to form Elliott-Hardy Racing. The new team premiered at the 1995 Daytona 500 as the No. 94 Ford with McDonald's sponsoring. Elliott's first year as an owner/driver was marked with eleven top-tens, two poles, and an eighth-place finish in the points. After a horrific crash in 1996 at Talladega Superspeedway, Elliott missed several races to recover from his injuries and was replaced by Dorsey Schroeder, Todd Bodine, Tommy Kendall, and Bobby Hillin Jr. In July 1996, the partnership between Elliott and Hardy was dissolved, the team being renamed Bill Elliott Racing.

Returning full-time in 1997, Elliott had fourteen top tens and another eighth-place finish in points. His team also expanded to a multi-car operation that year when Ron Barfield drove the No. 92 New Holland Ford to a twenty-second-place finish at the Brickyard 400. Elliott's operation went multi-car full-time in 1998, teaming up with Dan Marino the team being renamed Elliott-Marino Racing. The year was marked with sadness when Elliott had to miss the fall Dover race to attend the funeral of his father. In his place was Matt Kenseth, who finished sixth in his debut Cup race.

After a disappointing 1999 season which saw his multi-car operation dissolve back into No. 94, Elliott announced in early 2000 he was selling his equipment to championship-winning crew chief Ray Evernham to become part of Dodge's return to NASCAR. The team would also switch to No. 9.

Drivers
 Kenny Wallace (1994 for Charles Hardy)
 Bobby Hillin Jr. (1994 for Charles Hardy & 1996; night race at Bristol only)
 Bill Elliott (1995–2000)
 Harry Gant (1996; The Winston only)
 Tommy Kendall (1996; Sonoma only)
 Todd Bodine (1996; injury replacement for Elliott)
 Dorsey Schroeder (1996; Watkins Glen only)
 Ron Barfield (1997; Brickyard 400 only)
 Jerry Nadeau (1998)
 Wally Dallenbach Jr. (1998; replaced Nadeau mid-season)
 Dennis Setzer (1998; replaced Dallenbach mid-season)
 Tom Hubert (1998; Watkins Glen only)
 Matt Kenseth (1998; Interim driver; made Winston Cup debut at Dover in September.)
 Ted Musgrave (1998; finished the season)
 David Green (2000; raced at Bristol & Darlington in the summer)

Busch Series 
Elliott made his first start as a Busch Series team owner in 1988, driving both races at Charlotte in his No. 9 Ford, his best finish being a seventh. Three years later, he drove two late-season races in the No. 84, finishing in the top-ten both times. His next ownership run would come in 1993, when he fielded the No. 94 in a pair of races for his nephew Casey, who had a best finish of 20th.

In 1996, Elliott's protégé Ron Barfield ran six races in Elliott's No. 94 New Holland Ford, garnering a best finish of 11th at Charlotte. He ran times the following season and had two ninth-place runs. Elliott's last race as a Busch owner came in 1998, when Jeff Fuller finished fifteenth in the No. 94 Chevrolet at the Jiffy Lube Miami 300.

Craftsman Truck Series 
Elliott began fielding Truck entries in 1996 with the No. 94 Super 8 Motels Ford for Barfield. He had three top-tens in his first four starts, but only made a limited schedule of seven starts. He ran just one race in 1997, an eighth-place run at Walt Disney World Speedway. Late in the season, Elliott made one start at Las Vegas Motor Speedway with Team ASE Racing sponsoring, but he finished 31st after suffering engine problems.

References

External links 
Bill Elliott Owner Stats
Charles Hardy Owner Stats

1995 establishments in North Carolina
2000 disestablishments in North Carolina
American auto racing teams
Defunct companies based in North Carolina
Defunct NASCAR teams
Auto racing teams disestablished in 2000
Auto racing teams established in 1995